Judy Peiser (born June 4, 1945) is the American co-founder and executive director of the Center for Southern Folklore in Memphis, Tennessee, United States. She graduated with a bachelor of arts degree from the University of Illinois and a master's degree from the University of Memphis.

Peiser founded the Center for Southern Folklore in 1972 along with William Ferris.

Peiser has produced and edited documentary films including Fannie Bell Chapman: Gospel Singer, Gravel Springs Fife and Drum, and Ray Lum: Mule Trader, available on the Folkstreams project's website. In interviews she has cited a desire to meet and understand different people as one of the main motivators for her work. 

She is heavily involved in the Memphis Jewish community and often speaks of her faith. 

She is a member of the board of directors of the North American Folk Alliance.

References

Further reading
 Beale Street Culture Blues

American folklorists
Living people
1945 births
People from Tennessee
University of Illinois Urbana-Champaign alumni
University of Memphis alumni